Andisha Shahii is a young poet and short story writer. She is a Kyrgyzstan citizen of Afghan descent.

Andisha Shahii was born in 1991 in Bishkek, the capital of Kyrgyzstan. Her family originally originated from Kabul, Afghanistan, who immigrated to Kyrgyzstan in civil war around the 1990s.

Andisha Shahii is a poet and short story writer of Persian, English, Russian and German.

References 

Living people
1991 births
People from Bishkek
Kyrgyzstani people of Afghan descent
Kyrgyzstani poets
Kyrgyzstani women poets
Persian-language poets
Short story writers
Kyrgyzstani women writers